Billy Rowsome (born 1956 in Monageer, County Wexford) was an Irish sportsperson.  He played hurling with his local club Monageer and was a member of the Wexford senior inter-county team in the 1970s and 1980s.

References

1956 births
Living people
Wexford inter-county hurlers
Monageer Boolavogue hurlers